Success is an unincorporated community in Meigs County, in the U.S. state of Ohio.

History
A post office called Success was established in 1892, and remained in operation until 1907.

References

Unincorporated communities in Meigs County, Ohio
Unincorporated communities in Ohio